Sylvia Syms (December 2, 1917 – May 10, 1992) was an American jazz singer.

Biography
Syms was born Sylvia Blagman in Brooklyn, New York. As a child, she had polio. As a teenager, she went to jazz nightclubs on New York's 52nd Street and received informal training from Billie Holiday. She made her debut in 1941 at Kelly's Stable.

In 1948, performing at the Cinderella Club in Greenwich Village, she was seen by Mae West, who gave her a part in a show she was doing. Among others who observed her in nightclubs was Frank Sinatra who considered her the "world's greatest saloon singer." Sinatra conducted her 1982 album, Syms by Sinatra.

She was signed to a contract by Decca Records, having her major success with a recording of "I Could Have Danced All Night" in 1956, which sold over one million copies and was awarded a gold disc. Syms made regular appearances at the Carlyle in Manhattan. At times, impromptu, while enjoying a cocktail in the bar of the Carlyle, she would walk on stage and perform with the cabaret's other regular, Bobby Short.

Syms had a lung removed around 1972. The operation did not stop her from performing as Bloody Mary in the Rodgers and Hammerstein musical South Pacific at the Chateau de Ville Dinner Theater.

She died of a heart attack while on stage in the Oak Room at the Algonquin Hotel in New York City on May 10, 1992. She was 74 years old.

Discography

Films
 The Goldbergs (1950)
 The Blue Veil (1951)
 Night Without Sleep (1952)
 It Happens Every Thursday (1953)
 Some of My Best Friends Are... (1971)
 Born to Win (1971)

Television
 Eddie Condon's Floor Show – 1949
 The Tonight Show – 1954
 The Tonight Show – 1955
 The Tonight Show – 1956
 The VIP Show of the Year – Sep 9, 1956
 The Tonight Show – October 1956
 Stars of Jazz – Dec 17, 1956
 Art Ford's All-Star Jazz Party – 1958
 Playboy's Penthouse – Sep 23, 1961
 Playboy's Penthouse – Apr 21, 1962
 The Merv Griffin Show – 1962
 The Merv Griffin Show – 1963
 The Tonight Show – Sep 17, 1963
 The Mike Douglas Show – 1965
 The Merv Griffin Show – Jun 29, 1966
 Donald O'Connor Show – Oct 21, 1968
 The Merv Griffin Show – 1969
 The Mike Douglas Show – 1969
 The Mike Douglas Show – Aug 9, 1970
 The Tonight Show – Aug 6, 1972
 The Mike Douglas Show – Aug 11, 1974
 The Merv Griffin Show – 1974
 The Tonight Show – Feb 25, 1975
 The Merv Griffin Show – 1978
 The Dick Cavett Show – Nov 16, 1978
 Dinah! – Nov 17, 1978
 Over Easy – Nov 24, 1978
 Over Easy – May 23, 1980
 Glenn Miller: A Moonlight Serenade – Dec 1, 1984
 American Masters: The Long Night of Lady Day – Aug 3, 1986
 Buddy Barnes Live at Studio B – 1986

References

External links
Sylvia Syms biography on oldies.com
Sylvia Syms manuscript, printed music, and sound recordings, Institute of Jazz Studies, Rutgers University

1917 births
1992 deaths
Singers from New York City
American women jazz singers
American jazz singers
Traditional pop music singers
Jazz-blues musicians
Musicians who died on stage
Prestige Records artists
20th-century American singers
20th-century American women singers
Jazz musicians from New York (state)